The 65th Mobil 1 12 Hours of Sebring fueled by Fresh from Florida was an endurance sports car racing event held at Sebring International Raceway near Sebring, Florida from 16 to 18 March 2017. The race was the second round of the 2017 WeatherTech SportsCar Championship, as well as the second round of the North American Endurance Cup.

The race was won by Wayne Taylor Racing's Cadillac DPi-V.R driven by Ricky Taylor, Jordan Taylor, and Alex Lynn, ahead of Mustang Sampling Racing's Cadillac DPi-V.R and Whelen Engineering Racing's Cadillac DPi-V.R. The PC class winners were Performance Tech Motorsports with drivers James French, Patricio O'Ward, and Kyle Masson driving an Oreca FLM09. Corvette Racing won the GTLM class for the third straight year with Antonio García, Jan Magnussen, and Mike Rockenfeller taking the win in their Chevrolet Corvette C7.R. The GTD category was won by Riley Motorsports - WeatherTech Racing's Ben Keating, Jeroen Bleekemolen, and Mario Farnbacher in a Mercedes-AMG GT3.

Race

Results
Class winners are denoted in bold.

Statistics
 Pole Position - #13 Neel Jani - 1:48.178
 Fastest Lap - #31 Mike Conway - 1:49.629 on lap 100

References

External links

12 Hours of Sebring
12 Hours of Sebring
12 Hours of Sebring
12 Hours of Sebring